Okay FM (Ghana) Okay FM is a private radio station in the Greater Accra Region that ultimately is run by the Despite Group of Companies.  The station is both active on 101.7fm and online. The station is one of few stations owned and run by the media group company Despite Group of Companies. The station focus on playing African Music and foreign musical genres.

Notable personalities
Abeiku Santana
Fadda Dickson

References

External links 
 OkayFMOnline.com
 Online Streaming
 Facebook Community/Page

Radio stations in Ghana
Mass media in Ghana